Gowhar Gush (also Romanized as Gowhar Gūsh; also known as Gowhar Gūsh-e Kāz̧emābād) is a village in Mirbag-e Shomali Rural District, in the Central District of Delfan County, Lorestan Province, Iran. At the 2006 census, its population was 149, in 25 families.

References 

Towns and villages in Delfan County